Hans Edmund Nicola Burgeff (19 April 1883 – 27 September 1976) was a German botanist. He was father of the sculptor and medal engraver Hans Karl Burgeff.

1883 births
1976 deaths
20th-century German botanists